Kingston House is a historic inn and tavern in Unity Township, Westmoreland County, Pennsylvania, U.S.

Kingston House may also refer to:

Kingston House estate, London, Knightsbridge, London, England
Kingston House, Kingston upon Hull, England
Kingston House, Kingston Park, South Australia
Kingston House, Shrewsbury, England

See also
Kingston Maurward House, Dorset, England
Kingston (Upper Marlboro, Maryland), U.S., a historic home 
Zachry-Kingston House, in Morgan County, Georgia, U.S.